Imane Abdelahad (born 21 July 1994) is a Moroccan footballer who plays as a goalkeeper for Sporting Casablanca and the Morocco women's national team.

International career
Abdelahad played in the 2017-18 Turkish Women's First League season for Beşiktaş J.K. appearing in six matches of the league's second half.

References

External links

1994 births
Living people
People from Fez, Morocco
Moroccan women's footballers
Women's association football goalkeepers
Beşiktaş J.K. women's football players
Moroccan expatriate footballers
Moroccan expatriate sportspeople in Turkey
Expatriate women's footballers in Turkey